UCLA Santa Monica Medical Center is a hospital located within the city of Santa Monica, California.  The hospital was founded in 1926, and is a member of the UCLA Health. The hospital is also known internationally for operating its Rape Treatment Center and the adjoining Stuart House for sexually abused children.

History
The hospital was founded in 1926 by two doctors. In 1941 the hospital was acquired by the Lutheran Hospital Society of Southern California, who also owned California Hospital Medical Center. 

In 1986, the $36 million six-story Merle Norman Pavilion addition was constructed, which held 107 beds and two thirds of them being private rooms. In 1988, LHS merged with HealthWest, the parent company of Northridge Hospital, to form UniHealth.

In 1995, UCLA Medical Center bought Santa Monica Hospital from UniHealth.

In 2007 the 16,000 square foot Nethercutt Emergency Center was opened and contains 22 beds.

In 2012 the hospital replacement project was finished which started in 2000 the new replacement wings opened. the tower  built in 1967 was torn down and made room for a new courtyard. The north wing and central wing make up of the old tower and the only original building existing is the Merle Norman pavilion which is still in use today.

Orthopedic hospital
The orthopedic practice group at UCLA Santa Monica Medical Center, has been recognized as one of the best orthopedic hospitals in the United States.  In 2011, the UCLA Santa Monica Medical Center, opened a new facility next to the existing orthopedic hospital, on 15th Street and Wilshire Blvd.

Notable births
Shirley Temple, actress and diplomat

Notable deaths
Virginius E. Clark, military aviation pioneer
Jackie Coogan, actor
Stan Freberg, voice actor, comedian
Mehli Mehta, violinist, conductor, orchestra founder, father of Zubin and Zarin
Tom Petty, rock musician, singer-songwriter
Gene Roddenberry, creator of Star Trek
Clark Shaughnessy, American football coach and innovator of the T formation
Tamara Toumanova, prima ballerina
Michael Turner, comic book artist
Glen A. Larson, musician, television producer and director

See also
UCLA Health
Ronald Reagan UCLA Medical Center
David Geffen School of Medicine at UCLA
Harbor-UCLA Medical Center
Olive View-UCLA Medical Center

References

External links

This hospital in the CA Healthcare Atlas A project by OSHPD

Hospitals in Los Angeles County, California
Buildings and structures in Santa Monica, California
Medical Center, Santa Monica
Hospital buildings completed in 1926
Hospitals established in 1926
1926 establishments in California
Healthcare in Los Angeles
Organizations based in Santa Monica, California
UCLA Health